IFRI may refer to:
 International Forestry Resources and Institutions
 Institut Français de Recherche en Iran
 Institut français des relations internationales